Pseudonoseris is a genus of South American plants in the tribe Liabeae of the family Asteraceae.

 Species
 Pseudonoseris discolor (Muschl.) H.Rob. & Brettell - Peru, Bolivia
 Pseudonoseris glandulosa (Hieron.) Pruski - Peru
 Pseudonoseris striatum (Cuatrec.) H.Rob. & Brettell - Peru
 Pseudonoseris szyszylowiczii (Hieron.) H.Rob. & Brettell - Peru

References

Flora of South America
Asteraceae genera
Liabeae